Rönesans Holding is a Turkish contracting and investment company operating in construction, real estate development, energy, industrial facilities and health. The company operates in Turkey, the Commonwealth of Independent States, Europe, Middle East and North Africa. It was founded in 1993 by Erman Ilıcak in St. Petersburg, Russia, and has headquarters in Ankara, Turkey. Its main activities are construction, real estate investment and energy generation.

Rönesans Holding builds shopping malls, offices, hotels, residences, composite structures, heavy industry plants, infrastructure plants, light production plants, factories, government buildings and energy plants as main contractor and investor. In some projects, it takes on the management of its building. According to ENR data, Rönesans Holding owns the world's 24th-largest construction company, Renaissance Construction.

History

The company was founded in Saint Petersburg, Russia in 1993. The company contracts as a construction company in 28 countries globally and is the 8th-largest contracting company in Europe.

In 2018, the company signed a deal to build the Amur Gas Processing Plant and a tram network in Saint Petersburg. In 2019, Rönesans began collaborating with the Russian Direct Investment Fund to construct medical facilities across the country.

Group companies 
Construction
 RC Rönesans İnşaat Taahüt A.Ş.
 Rönesans Endüstri Tesisleri A.Ş.
 Rönesans Türkmen İnşaat A.Ş.
 Rönesans Mea İnşaat A.Ş.
 Rönesans Altyapı Tesisleri A.Ş.
 Rönesans Rusya İnşaat A.Ş.
 Rönesans Medikal İnşaat A.Ş.
 Rönesans Teknik İnşaat A.Ş.
 Ballast Nedam

Real Estate
 Rönesans Emlak Geliştirme Holding A.Ş.
 Rönesans Sağlık Yatırım A.Ş.
 Rönesans Gayrimenkul Yatırım A.Ş.
 Desna Gayrimenkul Yatırım A.Ş.
 İstanbul SEAPORT

Energy
 Rönesans Enerji Üretim A.Ş
 Rönesans Elektrik Enerji Toptan Satış A.Ş

References

External links 
 

Companies established in 1993
Holding companies of Turkey